Stein Widar Rønning (28 May 1965 – 23 January 2008) was a Norwegian karate master who had won international competitions, including the 1990 World Karate Championships, Male Kumite -60 kg, in Mexico City. He died in Stavanger.

References

External links
 Statistics 

1965 births
2008 deaths
Norwegian male karateka
People from Strand, Norway
World Games gold medalists
Competitors at the 1989 World Games
World Games medalists in karate
Sportspeople from Rogaland
20th-century Norwegian people